The Stereocaulaceae are a family of lichen-forming fungi in the order Lecanorales. It contains five genera. Species of this family are widely distributed in temperate boreal and austral regions.

Genera
Hertelidea  – 6 spp.
Lepraria  – 86 spp.
Stereocaulon  – 45 spp.
Squamarina  – 4 spp.
Xyleborus  – 2 spp.

References

Lichen families
Lecanoromycetes families
Taxa named by François Fulgis Chevallier
Taxa described in 1826